Garavand (also Romanized as Garāvand and Garāwand; also known as Garvand) is a village in Harasam Rural District, Homeyl District, Eslamabad-e Gharb County, Kermanshah Province, Iran. At the 2006 census, its population was 975, in 229 families.

References 

Populated places in Eslamabad-e Gharb County